Sir Michael Ogio  (7 July 1942 – 18 February 2017) was a Papua New Guinean politician who led People's Democratic Movement party. He served as the ninth governor-general of Papua New Guinea.

Biography 
He became acting governor-general on 20 December 2010 when Jeffrey Nape resigned after one week without explanation. He was elected as Governor-General in his own right on 14 January 2011 when he defeated Pato Kakeraya 65-23. He was sworn in on 25 February 2011.

On 26 April 2011, Queen Elizabeth II conferred the honour of knighthood and invested him as Knight Grand Cross of the Most Distinguished Order of St Michael and St George on his appointment as Governor-General of Papua New Guinea at Windsor Castle.

Ogio was suspended in December 2011 during the 2011–12 Papua New Guinean constitutional crisis.

Death 
Ogio died on 18 February 2017, in Port Moresby, at the age 74.

References 

|-

1942 births
2017 deaths
Commanders of the Order of the British Empire
Deputy Prime Ministers of Papua New Guinea
Governors-General of Papua New Guinea
Grand Companions of the Order of Logohu
Knights Grand Cross of the Order of St Michael and St George
People from the Autonomous Region of Bougainville